C. F. Hathaway Company was a private manufacturer of shirts for men and boys, located in Waterville, Maine.

The company was founded by Charles Foster Hathaway. Its early history is unclear. Though often described as starting in 1837, there is little evidence of this date. It is well-documented that in 1848 Hathaway built a shirt factory with Josiah Tillson in Watertown, Massachusetts, his share of which he sold to Tillson for $900 on March 31, 1853. On April 1, 1853, he wrote in his diary that he had agreed to form a partnership with his brother George to create a factory in Waterville to be incorporated as C. F. Hathaway and Co. On May 18, 1853, he purchased an acre of land on Appleton Street for $900 from Samuel Appleton, which was the site of the Hathaway
Shirt Factory for more than one hundred years. On June 1, 1853, ground was broken for the shirt factory, and it was in full operation by the end of October. Employees worked 60 hours per week, from 7 A.M. to 6 P.M., six days a week, with an hour off at noon. It later made uniform shirts for Union soldiers during the American Civil War.

Hathaway is most famous for its "man with an eye patch" advertising campaign created by Ogilvy & Mather in 1951. Inspired by a picture of public servant Lewis Douglas, who had lost an eye in a fishing accident, David Ogilvy recruited Baron George Wrangell, a Russian aristocrat with 20/20 vision, to appear in the ads. The campaign portrayed the "Hathaway man" as sophisticated and elegant, with a lifetime of interesting experiences. The campaign was selected by Advertising Age as #22 on its list of the greatest ad campaigns of the 20th century. The "Hathaway man" reappeared in a 1993 sketch on Saturday Night Live, played by Phil Hartman sans moustache. The Hathaway man works to get a discouraged hand model who lost part of a finger in a car accident back into modeling.

C. F. Hathaway Company closed its Maine factory in 2002, making it the second to last major American shirt company to produce shirts in the United States. Only Gitman Bros in northeast Pennsylvania continued at that time.

Further reading
 Remembered Maine, by Ernest Cummings Marriner, Colby College Press, 1957, pages 42–63. Includes excerpts from Hathaway's diaries.
 History of Middlesex County, Massachusetts: With Biographical Sketches of Many of Its Pioneers and Prominent Men, Volume 3, Duane Hamilton Hurd, J. W. Lewis & Company, Philadelphia, 1890, pages 407–409.
 "Charles Foster Hathaway", in Illustrated History of Kennebec County, Maine; 1625-1799-1892, Part 2, Henry D. Kingsbury, Simeon L. Deyo, H.W. Blake & Company, 1892, pages 588a-589a.

References

External links
Example of "man with an eye patch" advertisement

Hathaway Company
Hathaway Company
Hathaway Company
Hathaway Company
Hathaway Company
Waterville, Maine
Hathaway Company
Hathaway Company
1837 establishments in Maine
Hathaway Company